This is a list of protests in New Zealand.

Protests relating to the Treaty of Waitangi 

The Treaty of Waitangi was between the Māori and the British Crown and was first signed in 1840.

Environmental protests

Protests against employers 

This list contains notable protests against employers ether for the disruption caused or their results on society and working conditions. It also includes protests against the government when it is in the role of an employer.  As in a ten-year period from 2005–2015 there were an average of 25 strikes a years this list does not seek to cover every such protest.,

Protests for or against social change

See also
List of environmental protests
List of massacres in New Zealand
List of protests in the United States by size

References

History of New Zealand
New Zealand
 
New Zealand history-related lists